Dule may refer to:

Dule tree
Dule people, or Guna people, an indigenous people of Panama and Colombia
Dule, Ribnica, a village in the Municipality of Ribnica, southern Slovenia
Dule, Škocjan, a village in the Municipality of Škocjan, southeastern Slovenia
Dule Temple, in China

People with the name 
Dušan Dimitrijević, known as "Dule", Serbian chetnik
Dulé Hill, American actor and tap dancer
Parid Dule, Albanian painter and martial artist
Vangjel Dule, Greek politician

See also 
 Dhule, a city in India